Pliomelaena callista is a species of tephritid or fruit flies in the genus Pliomelaena of the family Tephritidae.

Distribution
Indonesia, Papua New Guinea.

References

Tephritinae
Insects described in 1941
Diptera of Asia